The 2018 Georgia State Panthers baseball team represented Georgia State University in the 2018 NCAA Division I baseball season. The Panthers played their home games at the GSU Baseball Complex.

Personnel

Roster

Coaching Staff

Schedule

! style="" | Regular Season
|- valign="top" 

|- bgcolor="#ccffcc"
| 1 || February 16 ||  || GSU Baseball Complex || W 3–1 || 1–0 || –
|- bgcolor="#ffcccc"
| 2 || February 17 || Connecticut || GSU Baseball Complex || L 1–10 || 1–1 || –
|- bgcolor="#ccffcc"
| 3 || February 18 ||  || GSU Baseball Complex || W 9–6 || 2–1 || –
|- bgcolor="#ffcccc"
| 4 || February 20 ||  || Auburn, AL || L 2–3 || 2–2 || –
|- bgcolor="#ccffcc"
| 5 || February 23 ||  || GSU Baseball Complex || W 6–2 || 3–2 || –
|- bgcolor="#ccffcc"
| 6 || February 24 || Jacksonville || Jacksonville, FL || W 7–0 || 4–2 || –
|- bgcolor="#ffcccc"
| 7 || February 25 || Jacksonville || Jacksonville, FL || L 3–5 || 4–3 || –
|- bgcolor="#ffffff"
| 8 || February 28 ||  || Athens, GA || Cancelled || – || –
|-

|- bgcolor="#ccffcc"
| 9 || March 2 ||   || GSU Baseball Complex || W 7–2 || 5–3 || –
|- bgcolor="#ccffcc"
| 10 || March 3 || Eastern Illinois || GSU Baseball Complex || W 8–2 || 6–3 || –
|- bgcolor="#ccffcc"
| 11 || March 4 || Eastern Illinois || GSU Baseball Complex || W 6–5 || 7–3 || –
|- bgcolor="#ccffcc"
| 12 || March 6 || Morehouse || GSU Baseball Complex || W 7–4 || 8–3 || –
|- bgcolor="#ffcccc"
| 12 || March 7 || || Atlanta, GA || L 6–12 || 8–4 || –
|- bgcolor="#ccffcc"
| 13 || March 9 ||  || Birmingham, AL || W 2–0 || 9–4 || –
|- bgcolor="#ccffcc"
| 14 || March 10 || Samford || Birmingham, AL || W 1–0 || 10–4 || –
|- bgcolor="#ccffcc"
| 15 || March 11 || Samford || Birmingham, AL || W 9–7 || 11–4 || –
|- align="center" bgcolor="#ffccc"
| 16 || March 13 || Ole Miss || GSU Baseball Complex || L 5–3 || 11–5 || –
|- align="center" bgcolor="#ffccc"
| 17 || March 14 || Ole Miss || GSU Baseball Complex || L 16–2 || 11–6 || –
|- align="center" bgcolor="#ffccc"
| 18 || March 16 ||  || Arlington, TX || L 4–6 || 11–7 || 0–1
|- align="center" bgcolor="#ffccc"
| 19 || March 17 || UT Arlington || Arlington, TX || L 10–12 || 11–8 || 0–2
|- align="center" bgcolor="#ffccc"
| 20 || March 18 || UT Arlington || Arlington, TX || L 5–6 || 11–9 || 0–3
|- align="center" bgcolor="#ffccc"
| 21 || March 20 || Georgia || GSU Baseball Complex || L 2–12 || 11–10 || 0–3
|- bgcolor="#ccffcc"
| 22 || March 23 ||  || GSU Baseball Complex || W 7–2 || 12–10 || 1–3
|- align="center" bgcolor="#ffccc"
| 23 || March 24 || South Alabama || GSU Baseball Complex || L 4–12 || 12–11 || 1–4
|- bgcolor="#ffffff"
| 24 || March 25 || South Alabama || GSU Baseball Complex || Cancelled || – || –
|- align="center" bgcolor="#ffccc"
| 25 || March 27 ||  || GSU Baseball Complex || L 9–15 || 12–12 || 1–4
|- align="center" bgcolor="#ffccc"
| 26 || March 29 ||  || Troy, AL || L 4–14 || 12–13 || 1–5 
|- bgcolor="#ccffcc"
| 27 || March 30 || Troy || Troy, AL || W 5–2 || 13–13 || 2–5 
|- align="center" bgcolor="#ffccc"
| 28 || March 31 || Troy || Troy, AL || L 3–8 || 13–14 || 2–6
|-

|- align="center" bgcolor="#ffccc"
| 29 || April 4 ||  || Greenville, SC || L 12–13 || 13–15 || 2–6
|- bgcolor="#ccffcc"
| 30 || April 6 ||  || GSU Baseball Complex || W 12–3 || 14–15 || 3–6
|- bgcolor="#ccffcc"
| 31 || April 7 || Arkansas State || GSU Baseball Complex || W 16–7 || 15–15 || 4–6
|- bgcolor="#ccffcc"
| 32 || April 8 || Arkansas State || GSU Baseball Complex || W 3–2 || 16–15 || 5–6
|- bgcolor="#ccffcc"
| 33 || April 11 || Georgia Tech || GSU Baseball Complex || W 5–2 || 17–15 || 5–6
|- align="center" bgcolor="#ffccc"
| 34 || April 13 ||  || GSU Baseball Complex || L 9–10 || 17–16 || 5–7
|- align="center" bgcolor="#ffccc"
| 35 || April 14 || Texas State || GSU Baseball Complex || L 5–10 || 17–17 || 5–8
|- align="center" bgcolor="#ffccc"
| 36 || April 15 || Texas State || GSU Baseball Complex || L 3–9 || 17–18 || 5–9
|- bgcolor="#ccffcc"
| 37 || April 18 ||  || GSU Baseball Complex || W 4–2 || 18–18 || 5–9
|- bgcolor="#ccffcc"
| 38 || April 20 || #20 Coastal Carolina || Conway, SC || W 3–2 || 19–18 || 6–9
|- align="center" bgcolor="#ffccc"
| 39 || April 21 || Coastal Carolina || Conway, SC || L 3–7 || 19–19 || 6–10
|- align="center" bgcolor="#ffccc"
| 40 || April 22 || Coastal Carolina || Conway, SC || L 1–3 || 19–20 || 6–11
|- bgcolor="#ccffcc"
| 41 || April 23 ||  || GSU Baseball Complex || W 9–5 || 20–20 || 6–11
|- bgcolor="#ccffcc"
| 42 || April 27 ||  || GSU Baseball Complex || W 6–5 || 21–20 || 7–11
|- align="center" bgcolor="#ffccc"
| 43 || April 28 || Louisiana || GSU Baseball Complex || L 4–6 || 21–21 || 7–12
|- align="center" bgcolor="#ffccc"
| 44 || April 29 || Louisiana || GSU Baseball Complex || L 7–9 || 21–22 || 7–13
|-

|- bgcolor="#ccffcc"
| 45 || May 2 || Savannah State || GSU Baseball Complex || W 10–2 || 22–22 || 7–13
|- align="center" bgcolor="#ffccc"
| 46 || May 4 || Louisiana–Monroe || Monroe, LA || L 6–9 || 22–23 || 7–14
|- align="center" bgcolor="#ffccc"
| 47 || May 5 || Louisiana–Monroe || Monroe, LA || L 2–11 || 22–24 || 7–15
|- align="center" bgcolor="#ffccc"
| 48 || May 6 || Louisiana–Monroe || Monroe, LA || L 4–9 || 22–25 || 7–16
|- bgcolor="#ccffcc"
| 49 || May 8 || Kennesaw State || Kennesaw, GA || W 7–4 || 23–25 || 7–16
|- bgcolor="#ccffcc"
| 50 || May 11 ||  || GSU Baseball Complex || W 2–4 || 24–25 || 8–16
|- align="center" bgcolor="#ffccc"
| 51 || May 12 || Appalachian State || GSU Baseball Complex || L 3–4 || 24–26 || 8–17
|- bgcolor="#ccffcc"
| 52 || May 13 || Appalachian State || GSU Baseball Complex || W 3–2 || 25–26 || 9–17
|- bgcolor="#ffffff"
| 53 || May 15 || Mercer || Macon, GA || Cancelled || – || –
|- align="center" bgcolor="#ffccc"
| 54 || May 17 ||    || Statesboro, GA || L 5–19 || 25–27 || 9–18
|- align="center" bgcolor="#ffccc"
| 55 || May 18 ||  Georgia Southern || Statesboro, GA || L 7–12 || 25–28 || 9–19
|- bgcolor="#ccffcc"
| 56 || May 19 ||  Georgia Southern || Statesboro, GA|| W 5–4 || 26–28 || 10–19
|-

|- align="center" bgcolor="#ffccc"
| 57 || May 22 ||  || Lafayette, LA || L 1–2 || 26–19 || (0–1)
|-

|

References

Georgia State
Georgia State Panthers baseball seasons